Poiretia is a genus of flowering plants in the legume family, Fabaceae. It belongs to the subfamily Faboideae, and was recently assigned to the informal monophyletic Adesmia clade of the Dalbergieae.

References

External links

Dalbergieae
Fabaceae genera